is a 　mountain of Chushin Highland, located in Nagawa, Nagano. This mountain is a part of the Yatsugatake-Chūshin Kōgen Quasi-National Park.

Leisure 
On Mount Denjō, there is Echo Valley Ski Resort.

Route 

There are several routes to the top of the mountain. The easiest route is to climb from Himekidaira. Other routes are from Mount Kuruma or Mount Ōsasa.

Access 
Himekidaira-Chuo Bus Stop of JR Kanto Bus

Gallery

References
Official Home Page of the Geographical Survey Institute in Japan
 ‘Yatsugatake, Tateshina, Utsukushigahara, Kirigamine 2008, Shobunsha

Denjo, Mount